Ulla! min Ulla! säj, får jag dig bjuda (Ulla! my Ulla! say, may I thee offer), is one of the Swedish poet and performer Carl Michael Bellman's best-known and best-loved songs, from his 1790 collection, Fredman's Epistles, where it is No. 71. A pastorale, it depicts the Rococo muse Ulla Winblad, as the narrator offers her "reddest strawberries in milk and wine" in the Djurgården countryside north of Stockholm.

The epistle is a serenade, subtitled "Till Ulla i fönstret på Fiskartorpet middagstiden en sommardag. Pastoral dedicerad till Herr Assessor Lundström" (To Ulla in the window in Fiskartorpet at lunchtime one summer's day. Pastorale dedicated to Mr Assessor Lundström). It has been described as the apogee of the bellmansk, and a breezy evocation of Stockholm's Djurgården park in summertime. The serenade form was popular at the time, as seen in Mozart's opera Don Giovanni; Bellman has shifted the setting from evening to midday. In each verse, Fredman speaks to Ulla, describing his love through delicious food and drink; in the refrain, he softly encourages her to admire nature all around, and she replies with a few meditative words. The erotic charge steadily increases from one verse to the next, complete in the last verse with the energy of a horse.

Context

Song

Music and verse form 

The song has three verses, each of 8 lines, with a chorus of 10 lines. The verses have the alternating rhyming pattern ABAB-CDCD. The Assessor Lundström of the dedication was a friend of Bellman's and a stock character in the Epistles.

The song is in  time, marked Allegro ma non troppo. The much-loved melody, unlike nearly all the rest of the tunes used in the Epistles, but like those of the other Djurgården pastorales, cannot be traced beyond Bellman himself and may thus be of his own composition. It is "spaciously Mozartian", with da capos at the end of each verse creating yet more space, before a sudden switch to a minor key for the chorus. Bellman's song about Haga, "Porten med blommor ett Tempel bebådar" ("The gate with flowers heralds a temple") is set to the same tune.

Lyrics 

The song is dated 1790, the year of publication, making this one of the last epistles to be written. It is dedicated to the assessor and member of Par Bricole, Carl Jacob Lundström, who helped find enough subscribers to finance the publication of Fredman's Epistles. It is possible that the late epistles, including nos. 80 and 82, were inspired by time spent with Helena Quiding at her summerhouse, Heleneberg, near Fiskartorpet.

The song imagines the Fredman/Bellman narrator, seated on horseback outside Ulla Winblad's window at Fiskartorpet on a fine summer's day. Thirsty in the heat, he invites the heroine to come and eat with him, promising "reddest strawberries in milk and wine". As pastorally, but in Paul Britten Austin's view less plausibly for anyone who liked drinking as much as Fredman, he suggests "a tureen of water from the spring". The bells of Stockholm can be heard in the distance, as calèches and coaches roll into the yard. The Epistle ends with a cheerful Skål! (Cheers!), as the poet settles "down beside the gate, in the warmest rye" with Ulla, to the "Isn't this heavenly" of the refrain. Where the stanzas are voiced by Fredman, the refrain consists of Fredman's questions and Ulla's brief but ecstatic answers.

Reception

Bellman's biographer, Paul Britten Austin, describes the song as "the apogee, perhaps, of all that is typically bellmansk.. the ever-famous Ulla, min Ulla, a breezy evocation of Djurgården on a summer's day."

The scholar of literature Lars Lönnroth sets "Ulla! min Ulla!" among Bellman's "great pastorals", alongside Fredman's Epistles no. 80, "Liksom en herdinna", and no. 82, "Vila vid denna källa". These have, he notes, been called the Djurgården pastorales, for their geographical setting, though they are not the only epistles to be set in that park. Lönnroth comments that they owe something of their tone and lexicon to "the elegant French-influenced classicism which was praised by contemporary Gustavian poets". These epistles incorporate, in his view, an element of parody and anti-pastoral grotesque, but this is dominated by a strong genuine pleasure in "the beauty of summer nature and the delights of country life". 

Lönnroth writes that the song is a serenade, as Bellman's dedication has it, "to Ulla in the window at Fiskartorpet". The form was popular at the time in works such as Mozart's opera Don Giovanni, deriving from Spanish, where a serenade (sera: "evening") meant a profession of love set to the strings of a guitar outside the beloved's window of an evening. In Bellman's hands, the setting is shifted to midday in a Swedish summer. Fredman can, he writes, be supposed to have spent the night with Ulla after an evening of celebration; now he sits on his horse outside her window and sings to her. In the first half of each verse, in the major key, he speaks straight to Ulla, offering his love in the form of delicious food and drink; in the second half, the refrain, in the minor key, he encourages her more softly to admire nature all around, and she replies with a meditative word or two: "Heavenly!"; "Oh yes!". There is, furthermore, a definite erotic charge, increasing in each of the three verses. In the first verse, the house's doors are suggestively blown open by the wind, while in the last verse, the neighing, stamping, galloping horse appears as a sexual metaphor alongside Fredman's expressed passion.

Charles Wharton Stork's 1917 anthology calls Bellman a "master of improvisation" who "reconciles the opposing elements of style and substance, of form and fire ... we witness the life of Stockholm [including] various idyllic excursions [like Epistle 71] into the neighboring parks and villages. The little world lives and we live in it." Hendrik Willem van Loon's 1939 introduction and sampler names Bellman "the last of the Troubadours, the man who was able to pour all of life into his songs".
Epistle 71 has been recorded by the stage actor Mikael Samuelsson (Sjunger Fredmans Epistlar, Polydor, 1990), the singers and by the noted Bellman interpreters Cornelis Vreeswijk, Evert Taube and Peter Ekberg Pelz. The Epistle has been translated into English by Eva Toller.

Notes

References

Sources

 
 
 
  (contains the most popular Epistles and Songs, in Swedish, with sheet music)
  (with facsimiles of sheet music from first editions in 1790, 1791)

External links 

 Text of Epistle 71

1790 compositions
Swedish songs
Fredmans epistlar